Georgios Iordanidis (born 17 October 1989) is a Greek former football player and current head coach.

Early life, coaching career, and education
He was born in 1989 to a middle-class family in Athens, the younger son of Iordanis Iordanidis, an auto electrician, and his wife, Dr. Ioanna Syriou, a secondary school principal. He played senior-level football for Eleftheroupoli, PAO Kalyvion, IFA, Sholing, and QK Southampton but several injuries led him to put an early end in his career. In July 2014, he graduated with a Bachelor of Arts in Football Studies from Southampton Solent University, and earlier that year received the FA Level 2 coaching badge from the English FA. On 12 February 2016, he was appointed national team head coach by the Greek Amputee FA. In his debut as a head coach Greece Amputee FA drew 3-3 to AEK Futsal in a friendly game. In June 2016, he led the national team in the country's first participation in the EAFF Amputee Football Weeks project. In January 2017, he organized a charity tournament to gather food supplies for homeless people in Athens. On 11 January 2017, he resigned from his post due to military service obligations. On 18 January 2017, he was invited by R.S.I. as an experiential guest at Avlonas juvenile detention center to increase the sensitivity levels of young offenders on road culture and safety matters. He has also worked as a talent identification scout for GKS Górnik Łęczna and Wisła Kraków of the Ekstraklasa in two different seasons (2016–17, 2017–18). In December 2022, he graduated with a Master of Science in Football Coaching from the Global Institute of Sport of the University of East London. Apart from his native Greek, he speaks English, Spanish, and French to varying degrees of fluency.

Career statistics

Managerial statistics

Popular culture
His name Georgios derives from the Ancient Greek word georgós which means "earth-worker". The word itself is a compound of gē ("earth", "soil") and ergon ("task", "undertaking", "work"). His paternal surname, Iordanidis, means "son of the one who descends" or "descendant of the one who flows down". It derives from the Hebrew name Yarden, which means "to descend" or "to flow down", in combination with the suffix -idis, of the Greek surnames, that means "the son of" or "the descendant of". His maternal surname, Syrios, means "to glow" or "to scorch" and derives from the Ancient Greek dog-star Sirius of Greek mythology.

He is a supporter of Super League 1 club AEK Athens, and an admirer of Primera División club Boca Juniors.

He is featured, as a scout for Wisła Kraków of the Ekstraklasa, in the 2018 edition of the Football Manager simulation video game.

His brother Socrates Iordanidis MEd is an aquatic therapist for children with disabilities.

His cousin Alex Sinoyannis was a Team Penske No. 22 vehicle dynamic engineer in the NASCAR Cup Series from 2013 to 2016.

His half-cousin Alexandros Dimitropoulos was a Super League 1 referee from 2011 to 2016. In 2011, he was accused of match-fixing by the football prosecutor, Antonakakis, but was later acquitted of all charges by the  Three-Member Felony Court of Appeals in Athens.

His uncle Stelios Iordanidis was a folk music singer who sang with Themis Adamantidis, among others.

His uncle George Sinoyannis was a president and executive member of AHEPA Montreal in Canada.

His aunt Olga Iordanidou MD, a general surgeon and intensive-care specialist, was elected as an administrator of the second health region of Piraeus and Aegean by the Hellenic Parliament members in 2016. Of her many works, the most important were: the donation of a 16-slice CT scanner from Asklipio Voula hospital to Naxos general hospital, the creation of pulmonology offices in the islands of Naxos, Milos, Tinos, Paros, Serifos, and Sifnos, and the facilitation of medical treatment for cancer patients who needed it due to the atmospheric pollution caused by the catastrophic wildfires of 2018.

His aunt Meropi Jordano (stage name) was a Greek opera singer and teacher in Austria, Switzerland, and Germany.

His aunt Maria Moschou is the daughter of five-time GBL champion Georgios Moschos who played for Panellinios Athens, Iraklis Salonica, and AEK Athens basketball clubs and died from lymphoma at the age of twenty-nine.

References

Bibliography
Συλλογικό έργο (2006). Ημερολόγιο ομάδος - Α.Ο. Νέας Ιωνίας . Αθήνα, Ελλάδα: Εκδόσεις Τυπογραφείο.

External links
Georgios Iordanidis at sortitoutsi.net

1989 births
Living people
Footballers from Athens
Association football central defenders
Eleftheroupoli F.C. players
Sholing F.C. players
Southern Football League players
Greek expatriate footballers
Expatriate footballers in England
Greek expatriate sportspeople in England
Greek football managers
Alumni of Solent University
Alumni of the University of East London